Tracy Maddux is an American music business executive who is Chief Commercial Officer of Downtown Music Holdings, the parent company of AVL Digital Group which included CD Baby and a suite of other promotional services and tools for musical artists. These include AdRev (monetization for content on YouTube and other platforms), DashGo (label and artist services), Soundrop (distribution platform), HearNow (website development for musical artists), Show.co (music marketing), and AudioMicro (stock music and sound effects). The CD Baby music store was shut down in March 2020.

Education
Maddux received a BA in Government from the University of Texas at Austin in 1991 and an MBA in Finance and IT from Indiana University's Kelley School of Business in 1998.

Career
After a stint in finance at Intel, from 2001-2009, Maddux became COO/President of Logic General, a manufacturer of CDs and DVDs for the software and music industries. In that role he began pressing discs for independent music labels.

He became COO of Portland, Oregon-based CD Baby in 2010, and CEO in 2012. CD Baby was Oregon's largest music employer in 2019.

In March 2019, music-rights management company Downtown Music Holdings purchased CD Baby's parent company, AVL Digital Group, from Disc Makers for $200 million. Maddux served as CEO of AVL, which operates as a separate subsidiary. In November 2020, Maddux was promoted to Chief Commercial Officer of AVL Digital Group’s parent company, Downtown Music Holdings.

Also in 2019, Maddux oversaw partnerships between CD Baby and automatic content recognition platform Audible Magic and automated mastering platform CloudBounce.

Honors
In August 2018, Billboard named Maddux to its Indie Power Players list. He appeared on the 2019 Indie Power Players list as well, citing "scaling the global CD Baby team" as his greatest recent accomplishment and pointing to the company's presence in "nine countries, including Argentina, Brazil, Canada, Colombia, Chile, Mexico, Singapore and the U.K."

References

Living people
American business executives
American music industry executives
Businesspeople from Portland, Oregon
Year of birth missing (living people)